Ossemotor (also Enu-Igbo) is an ancient river port and park on the bank of the lean 'finger-like' Oguta Lake in Imo State, southeastern Nigeria. Known for its rich history of commerce, Ossemotor was a strategic economic centre in the Eastern Region of Nigeria. Occupying approximately 46.50 km2 in landmass, it is a part of the Oguta metropolis in Imo State. Ossemotor was used for exchange, evacuation and shipment of goods.

Economy
Osemotor is a farming and fishing community in Oguta LGA. International Marine University has been proposed for Osemotor to help unlock the economic potentials of the port.

References

Tourist attractions in Imo State
Towns in Imo State
Inner Niger Delta